Warren-Blackwood is an electoral district of the Legislative Assembly in the Australian state of Western Australia from 1950 to 2008, and from 2013 onwards.

Known as Warren until 1996, the district was located in the south-west of the state and first contested at the 1950 state election. The seat was abolished ahead of the 2008 state election as a result of the reduction in rural seats made necessary by the one vote one value reforms. Its former territory was largely absorbed by the seat of Blackwood-Stirling, with parts also added to Vasse. The following state election saw the changes essentially reversed, with the name Blackwood-Stirling reverting to Warren-Blackwood.

Members for Warren-Blackwood

Election results

References

External links
 
 
 

Electoral districts of Western Australia